Boumdeid  is a town and commune in Mauritania. 
It is located in the Aoukar basin, which formerly gave name to the greater region.

References

Communes of Assaba Region